The tamborita or tamborita calentana is a percussion instrument from Mexico. It is used in conjuntos de música calentana, in the states of Guerrero, Michoacán and Estado de México.

It is a double-headed skin drum, traditionally built with Parota root wood. Rims are made of aisinchete schrub and are tightened as in military drums. It is performed with a pair of wood sticks, one of these with a skin covered head to soften the sound.
Tamborita accompanies guitars and violins in sones and gustos of tierracalenteña music.

References

External links 
Photo of tamborita
Photo of tamborita
Son calentano

Mexican musical instruments
Drums